Surfing in Scotland is a minor sport. The water around Scotland is fairly cold, requiring a full wetsuit, although it is warmed by the Gulf Stream.

In 2008, the actor Billy Boyd fronted VisitScotland's Perfect Day Campaign, and talked particularly of his love of surfing in Scotland, particularly in Machrihanish near the town of Campbelltown in Kintyre on the west coast of Scotland and Pease Bay and Coldingham Bay on Scotland's east coast. In an interview about the campaign with The Scotsman on 28 July, he said "I don't really do much promotional stuff but felt that with this one I could be honest...I'm very proud of where I come from and I get very excited if a friend comes over and I can show them around."

Surfing locations

Surfing locations in Scotland include the following:

East Coast
 Coldingham Bay
 Eyemouth
 Pease Bay
 St. Abbs

West Coast
 Machrihanish, Kintyre

North Coast
 Thurso East

Islands
 Ness, Lewis
 Tiree

References